Relations between Canada and the Democratic People's Republic of Korea (commonly known as North Korea) are very limited, as Canada suspended full diplomatic relations in 2010 over North Korea's destabilizing nuclear activity. Travel and commerce with North Korea are discouraged by the Canadian government and there is very little trade or diplomatic contact due to Canada's perspective that North Korea plays a destabilizing role in the Asia Pacific region.

Although diplomatic relations between Canada and North Korea were established in February 2001, diplomatic relations between the two countries have generally been strained due to Canada's close relationship with the United States, and Canada's staunch opposition to North Korea's nuclear ambitions and programs, and as a result, contact between them has been almost non-existent throughout history. Consequently, there has never been an official embassy built in either of the two nations. Full diplomatic relations were suspended by Canada in 2010 and replaced by a Controlled Engagement Policy limiting official bilateral contact to specific topics. Canada is officially represented by the Ambassador of Canada to Korea resident in the South Korean capital Seoul, and North Korea is represented through their permanent representative to the United Nations in New York. Sweden acts as the protecting power for Canadian citizens that travel to North Korea. North Korea has requested for an ambassador and mission to be created, but Canada has declined.

According to a 2013 BBC World Service Poll, only 7% of Canadians view North Korea's influence positively, with 79% expressing a negative view.

History 
Contact between Canada and Korea dates back to the 19th century when Canadians were among the first Westerners to arrive on the Korean Peninsula. Most of them were Christian missionaries, though they branched out into other fields of work. Reverend James Scarth Gale created the Korean-English Dictionary which became the first and most essential tool for the scholarly study of Korea in the West. His translation of the Bible into Korean constituted the foundation of Korean Christianity. Another Canadian, Dr. Oliver R. Avison, was the personal physician to King Kojong and is considered the founder of modern medical knowledge in Korea. Official contact began in 1947 when Canada participated in the United Nations Commission overseeing election in Korea. Canada formally recognized the Republic of Korea in 1949 and the Democratic People's Republic in 2000.

When the war broke out between North and South Korea in 1950, Canada sent 26,971 military personnel to Korea as part of United Nations Command, the third largest contingent behind the United States and the United Kingdom; 516 Canadians died in the war.

On 25 May 2010, Canada suspended diplomatic relations with North Korea over its alleged role in the sinking of ROKS Cheonan.

Canadian NGOs 
CanKor is one organization contributing to the dialogue over Canada's role with DPR Korea.

Humanitarian aid 
There are a small number of organizations providing aid to DPR Korea. First Steps is a Vancouver-based Christian development organization.

Canadian Foodgrains Bank is a partnership of Canadian churches and church-based agencies.

Mennonite Central Committee is also a well known organization that provides aid to the impoverished Korean nation.

Advocacy organizations 
HanVoice is a Canadian non-profit organization that was first established to support the resettlement of DPR Korean refugees in Canada and has grown over the years to become the largest Canadian organization advocating for improved human rights in North Korea. Today, the organization supports DPRK refugees resettle in the Greater Toronto Area, finances on-the-ground humanitarian initiatives in DPR Korea and works with leading politicians and policy experts to promote the human rights agenda.

Canadian academic institutions 
UBC's Institute of Asian Research houses the Centre for Korean Research. In 1993, the centre was established as a constituent part of the Institute of Asian Research. It was established to facilitate multidisciplinary research on Korea.

York University provides a focus on North Korea through its York Centre for Asian Research, Korean Studies Group. This group brings the study of South Korea, DPR Korea, and the Korean diaspora together, investigating the formation of the national division and shifting boundaries of the nation. Drawing scholars together from different disciplines, it seeks to develop a comparative perspective that places Korean affairs in dialogue with historical, global and theoretical changes.

The University of Toronto houses the Centre for the Study of Korea, Asian Institute, Munk School of Global Affairs. The centre was established in the fall of 2006 with the goal of promoting critical approaches to the research of Korea.

Friendship organizations 
The Korean Friendship Association is also active in Canada, hosting events such as leafleting, movies, educationals, and other projects to help show the DPRK and promote solidarity. The Official Delegate of Canada for the KFA is Comrade Trevor Spencer.

References

External links
 Canada - Democratic People’s Republic of Korea
 Canada-Korea Relations: A Strengthened Friendship

 
North Korea
Bilateral relations of North Korea